Student No: 1 is a 2001 Indian Telugu-language coming-of-age romantic action film directed by S. S. Rajamouli. K. Raghavendra Rao produced the film. Student No: 1 marks the directorial debut of Rajamouli in a feature film. The film stars N. T. Rama Rao Jr., Gajala and Rajeev Kanakala. The film was made on a budget of 1.85 crore (US$392,000) and earned a distributors' share of 12 crore (US$2.54 million). It was one of the most successful Telugu films of 2001.  

The film was later remade in Tamil as Student Number 1 in 2003 and in Odia as Mate Ta Love Helare (2008).

Plot
Aditya (N. T. Rama Rao Jr.) joins a law college in Vizag as a student. The college is notorious for its unruly students headed by Satish / Satya (Rajiv Kanakala). Aditya is shown as a mysterious young man, and throughout the first half, there are flashbacks to his story. He makes the unruly students mend their ways. In the interval, we come to know that Aditya is a criminal facing murder charges and is serving his life term in Vizag central jail. He attends college with the special permission of the jail authorities. Aditya lives in Hyderabad with his parents. He has finished his intermediate studies (10th grade plus 2). He wants to pursue engineering, but his father wants him to study law. This presents a tension between them, leading to a confrontation. Meanwhile, Aditya unintentionally murders a goon while saving a girl from getting raped. Aditya's father disowns him as his son, and Aditya surrenders at a police station. The rest of the film is how Aditya wins his father's heart with the law degree he earns.

Cast

 N. T. Rama Rao Jr. as Aditya
 Gajala as Anjali
 Rajiv Kanakala as Satish / Satya
 Brahmanandam as Dr. Brahmanandam
 Ali as Engineer Ali
 Sudha as Aditya's mother
 Kota Srinivasa Rao as Samba Sivam a.k.a. Leakage Sambayya, leakage leader
 Malladi Raghava as Aditya's father
 M. S. Narayana as Law School Lecturer
 Gundu Sudarshan
 Ajay as Satya's Batchmate
 Tanikella Bharani as Jailor
 Sekhar as goon
 Preeti Nigam
 L. B. Sriram Hostel Chef
 Sameer as Police officer

Release
The film was released with 40 prints.

Box office
Student No: 1 was sold at a price of Rs. 2.75 crore and collected a share of Rs. 12 crore. This movie was N. T. Rama Rao Jr.'s first super hit. It had a 50-day run in 73 centres. This movie had a 100-day run in 42 centres.

Soundtrack
The music was composed by M. M. Keeravani and released by Aditya Music. All lyrics were penned by Chandrabose.

Awards
M. M. Keeravani won Nandi Award for Best Male Playback Singer for the song "Ekkado Putti"

Notes

References

External links 
 

2001 films
2000s Telugu-language films
Films scored by M. M. Keeravani
Films directed by S. S. Rajamouli
2000s action drama films
Indian action drama films
Films shot in Visakhapatnam
Films shot in Switzerland
Films set in Hyderabad, India
Telugu films remade in other languages
2001 directorial debut films